John Lester Nash Jr. (August 19, 1940October 6, 2020) was an American singer-songwriter, best known in the United States for his 1972 hit "I Can See Clearly Now". Primarily a reggae and pop singer, he was one of the first non-Jamaican artists to record reggae music in Kingston.

Early life
Nash was born on 19 August 1940 in Houston, Texas, the son of Eliza (Armstrong) and John Lester Nash. He sang in the choir at Progressive New Hope Baptist Church in South Central Houston as a child. Beginning in 1953, Nash sang covers of R&B hits on Matinee, a local variety show on KPRC-TV; from 1956 he sang on Arthur Godfrey's radio and television programs for a seven-year period. Nash was married three times, and had two children.

Career
Signing with ABC-Paramount, Nash made his major label debut in 1957 with the single "A Teenager Sings the Blues". He had his first chart hit in early 1958 with a cover of Doris Day's "A Very Special Love". Marketed as a rival to Johnny Mathis, Nash also enjoyed success as an actor early in his career, appearing in the screen version of playwright Louis S. Peterson's Take a Giant Step in 1959. Nash won a Silver Sail Award for his performance from the Locarno International Film Festival. Nash continued releasing singles on a variety of labels such as Groove, Chess, Argo, and Warner Bros.

Nash sang the theme song to the syndicated animated cartoon series The Mighty Hercules, which ran on various television stations from 1963 to 1966.

In 1964, Nash and manager Danny Sims formed JoDa Records in New York. JoDa released The Cowsills' single "All I Really Want to Be Is Me". Although JoDa filed for bankruptcy after only two years, Nash and Sims moved on to marketing American singers to Jamaica, owing to the low cost of recording in that country.

In 1965, Nash had a top five hit in the US Billboard R&B chart, the ballad "Let's Move and Groove Together". It was just outside the Top 40 in Canada at #44. That year, he and Sims moved to Jamaica. Their lawyer Newton Willoughby was the father of Jamaican radio host Neville Willoughby. After selling off his old entertainment assets in New York, Sims opened a new music publishing business in Jamaica, Cayman Music. Nash planned to try breaking the local rocksteady sound in the United States. Around 1966 or 1967, Neville Willoughby took Nash to a Rastafarian party where Bob Marley & The Wailing Wailers were performing. Members Bob Marley, Bunny Wailer, Peter Tosh, and Rita Marley introduced Nash to the local music scene. Nash signed all four to an exclusive publishing contract with Cayman Music for J$50 a week.

In 1967, Nash, Arthur Jenkins, and Sims collaborated to create a new label, JAD Records (after their first names Johnny, Arthur, and Danny), and recorded their albums at Federal Records in Kingston. JAD released Nash's rocksteady single "Hold Me Tight" in 1968; it became a top-five hit in both the U.S. and UK, and number 1 in Canada. In 1971, Nash scored another UK hit with his cover of Marley's "Stir It Up".

Nash's 1972 reggae-influenced single "I Can See Clearly Now" sold over one million copies, and was awarded a gold disc by the R.I.A.A. in November 1972. "I Can See Clearly Now" reached No. 1 on the Billboard Hot 100 on November 4, 1972, and remained atop the chart for four weeks, spending the same four weeks atop the adult contemporary chart. The I Can See Clearly Now album includes four original Marley compositions published by JAD: "Guava Jelly", "Comma Comma", "You Poured Sugar on Me", and the follow-up hit "Stir It Up". "There Are More Questions Than Answers" was a third hit single taken from the album.

Nash was also a composer for the Swedish romance film Want So Much to Believe (1971), in which he portrayed 'Robert'. The movie soundtrack, partly instrumental reggae with strings, was co-composed by Bob Marley and arranged by Fred Jordan.

JAD Records ceased to exist in 1971, but it was revived in 1997 by American Marley specialist Roger Steffens and French musician and producer Bruno Blum for the Complete Bob Marley & the Wailers 1967–1972 ten-album series, for which several of the Nash-produced Marley and Tosh tracks were mixed or remixed by Blum for release. In the UK, his biggest hit was with the song "Tears on My Pillow" which reached number one in the UK Singles Chart in July 1975 for one week.

After a cover of Sam Cooke's "Wonderful World" in 1976 and "Let's Go Dancing" in 1979, for many years Nash seemed to have dropped out of sight. He had a brief resurgence in the mid-1980s with the album Here Again (1986), which was preceded by the minor UK hit, "Rock Me Baby". Younger audiences were introduced to Nash's music with the appearance of Jimmy Cliff's cover of "I Can See Clearly Now" in Disney's 1993 hit film Cool Runnings, and Nash's original version appeared over the opening scene of John Cusack's 1997 film, Grosse Point Blank. In May 2006, Nash was singing again at SugarHill Recording Studios and at Tierra Studios in his native Houston. Working with SugarHill chief engineer Andy Bradley and Tierra Studios' Randy Miller, he began the work of transferring analog tapes of his songs from the 1970s and 1980s to Pro Tools digital format.

Acting career
Nash has four acting credits in film and television. In 1959, he had the lead role as Spencer Scott in Take a Giant Step, directed by Philip Leacock, one of the first black family films written by a black writer. In 1960, he appeared as "Apple" alongside Dennis Hopper in the crime drama Key Witness. In 1971, he played Robert in the Swedish romance Vill så gärna tro.

Death
Nash died peacefully of natural causes in his home, surrounded by close family in Houston on October 6, 2020, after a period of declining health. He was 80.

Selected discography

Albums
Source: AllMusic

Compilations
Source: AllMusic

Soundtrack
Nash sang the theme song for the television cartoon series The Mighty Hercules, which aired in first-run syndication from 1963 to 1966.

Singles
Source: AllMusic

Notes

References

External links

1940 births
2020 deaths
American male pop singers
20th-century African-American male singers
American tenors
Musicians from Houston
Writers from Houston
Singers from Texas
American expatriates in Jamaica
Groove Records artists
Epic Records artists
ABC Records artists
Argo Records artists
MAM Records artists
Traditional pop music singers
20th-century American singers
20th-century American male singers
21st-century American singers
21st-century American male singers
21st-century African-American male singers